Władysław Loewenhertz was a male former Polish international table tennis player and Australian national and state table tennis champion .

He won a bronze medal at the 1935 World Table Tennis Championships in the Swaythling Cup (men's team event) with Alojzy Ehrlich and Simon Pohoryles for Poland.

Along with his teammates they were the first Polish medal winner at the Championships. He played for the local Jewish sports club Hasmonea Lwów.

Just prior to the onset of World War II, he departed Poland for a new life in Australia where he adopted the name of Walter Lowen.

See also
 List of table tennis players
 List of World Table Tennis Championships medalists

References

Polish male table tennis players
Jewish table tennis players
20th-century Polish Jews
World Table Tennis Championships medalists
1916 births
2011 deaths